Kenneth Ronaldson (27 September 1945 – 2021) was a Scottish professional footballer of the late 1960s.  He played professionally for Aberdeen, Bristol Rovers and Gillingham and made a total of 82 appearances in the Football League. Ronaldson, who retired from football in 1970 and then worked in the Kent Police force, died in 2021.

References

1945 births
2021 deaths
Scottish footballers
Association football forwards
English Football League players
Bristol Rovers F.C. players
Gillingham F.C. players
People from Leith
Aberdeen F.C. players
Scottish Football League players